This article displays the squads for the 2016 African Women's Handball Championship. Each team consists of 16 players.

Algeria

Head coach: Semir Zuzo

Angola

Head coach: Filipe Cruz

Cameroon

Congo

DR Congo

Guinea

Head coach: Kevin Decaux

Ivory Coast

 Rokhia Fondio
 Gervaise Tegbaglo
 Eva Sigui
 Awa Saramoko
 Abiba Fofana
 Minata Kone
 Ohiri Djedje
 Paula Gondo-Bredou
 Sery Toualy
 Adjoua Konan
 Makourakou Diomande
 Bietso N’kayo
 Ida Yao
 Mariam Traore
 Gaelle Issifou
 Brou Kouame

Senegal

Head coach: Cheick Seck

Tunisia
Head coach: Mohamed Ali Sghir

References

External links
todor66.com

2016 Women squads
2016 in African handball
Handball squads